The Sinansan Line (Hangul: 신안산선, Hanja: 新安山線, meaning "New Ansan Line") is the tentative name of a commuter rail line that will eventually link Cheongnyangni station with western Gyeonggi province, passing through key areas of the Seoul metropolitan area, including Yeouido, Yeongdeungpo and Gwangmyeong station.

Planning 
The forerunner of the Sinansan Line was Line 10, proposed in 1994 as part of Seoul Metro's Phase 3 expansion but was mostly unbuilt due to the 1997 Asian financial crisis. Originally Line 10 was also planned to extend east beyond downtown Seoul going through either Sinchon, Dongnimmun and Hyehwa or pass through Gongdeok, Seoul Station and Dongdaemun Stadium. However, following the restoration of the Cheonggye Stream, under which Line 10 was planned to be laid, the former route seems much more likely.

The Sinansan Line underwent many design changes during planning stages, but generally the line was envisioned to run between Sinpung and Gwangmyeong station. In particular, the section south of Gwangmyeong station has led to heated disputes between the cities of Ansan and Siheung. Ansan has requested for the line to be built almost perfectly south from Gwangmyeong station so it terminates at Hanyang Univ. ERICA Campus, passing through Seongpo-dong on the way. This would also open the possibilities for the trains on this line to travel to Suwon via the Suin Line. The consortium behind the construction of the Sin Ansan Line, however, favors a line running southwest from Gwangmyeong station and joining the Sosa-Wonsi Line, transferring with Line 4 and the Suin Line at Choji station and terminating at southwestern Ansan. The city of Siheung proposed the section in dispute does not even pass through the city of Ansan at all, making the name "Sinansan Line" meaningless. The Siheung plan has the section go west from Gwangmyeong station, intersect the Sosa-Wonsi Line at Siheung City Hall, and terminating at Wolgot station.

Construction was planned to begin in 2015 with the first section of this line (Gwangmyeong station - Yeouido) is set to be opened in 2023. However, contract disputes between the Ministry of Land, Transport and Maritime Affairs and the preferred operator delayed the project and lead to a retendering.

Construction of Phase 1 (Yeouido to Hanyang University/Songsan stations) began 2019 September 9.

History
 2007 June 7: Feasibility Study Announcement
 2007 June 5: The Primary Route Announced
 2008 March 20: Second Route Announced
 2009 November 3: Confirmed Gwangmyeong Southern Section Final Route
 2010 December 15: Master Plan Presented

Stations

NOTE: The Ministry of Land, Transport and Maritime Affairs announced the station list on December 15, 2010, routes are finally announced on 2015.

Siheung Branch Line (planned)

References

Proposed public transport in South Korea
Seoul Metropolitan Subway lines